2,4-Diacetylphloroglucinol or Phl is a natural phenol found in several bacteria:

 Specific strains of the Gram-negative bacterium Pseudomonas fluorescens. This compound is found to be responsible for the antiphytopathogenic and biocontrol properties in these strains.
 It is also found in Pseudomonas protegens, where it has the same activity against various plant pathogens.
 Lysobacter gummosus, a bacterium which lives on the skin of red-backed salamanders.
 Isolates of Pseudomonas aurantiaca found in Ukraine, living in root symbiosis produce it to control Fusarium oxysporum.

References 

Phloroglucinols
Aromatic ketones